Oswald Dietz (May 27, 1823 in Wiesbaden – March 9, in Cincinnati) was a German freedom fighter and German-American engineer and politician.

Biography 
He became an architect. He participated in the German revolution of 1848-1849.  When the German uprising was suppressed, Dietz escaped to London.  Oswald Dietz became a member of the August Willich-Karl Schapper sectarian proletarian group within the Communist League.  Oswald Diest also participated in the Civil war in the United States of America.  Dietz died in 1898.

References

1823 births
1898 deaths
German revolutionaries
People of the American Civil War
Members of the Socialist Labor Party of America
19th-century German architects